Plectocretacicus is an extinct genus of prehistoric ray-finned fish that lived during the lower Cenomanian. It contains a single species, P. clarae. Plectocretacicus is the earliest known member of the order Tetraodontiformes.

See also

 Prehistoric fish
 List of prehistoric bony fish

References

Late Cretaceous fish
Tetraodontiformes
Prehistoric fish of Africa
Prehistoric ray-finned fish genera